Doublet is a word derived from the Latin duplus, "twofold, twice as much", and is used to indicate a pair of identical, similar, or related things.

Doublet may refer to:

Apparel
Doublet (clothing), a man's snug-fitting buttoned jacket that was worn from the late 14th century to the mid 17th century
Doublet (Highland dress), a formal jacket worn with Scottish highland dress

Games 
 Doublet (dominoes), a domino tile in which both ends have the same value
 Doublets (game), old English tables game in the same family as Backgammon
Word ladder or "doublets", a word game invented by Lewis Carroll

Science and technology
Doublet (computing), a group of 16 bits in computing
Doublet (lens), a type of lens, made up of two stacked layers with different refractive indices
Doublet (linguistics), two or more words of the same language that come from the same root
Doublet (potential flow), fluid flow due to a source–sink combination
Doublet, or dimeresia howellii, a tiny flowering plant
Doublet earthquake, two earthquakes associated by space and time
Doublet state, a state in quantum physics of a system with a spin of 
Unit doublet, in mathematics, the derivative of the Dirac delta function

Other uses
 Doublet (horse), (b. 1963 - †.1974), a thoroughbred gelding
Doublet (lapidary), an assembled gem composed in two sections, such as a garnet overlaying green glass
Doublet, in textual criticism, two different narrative accounts of the same actual event
Pierre Jean Louis Ovide Doublet (1749–1824), French politician and writer affiliated with the Order of Malta
Michel Doublet (1939–2022), French politician.